L'assistente sociale tutto pepe (The all pepper social worker), also known as L'assistente sociale tutta pepe e tutta sale, is a 1981 Italian commedia sexy all'italiana directed by Nando Cicero.

Plot 
Nadia, a social worker, is sent to a township where she meets strange people that in order to survive commit any sort of thefts and scams, usually without success ...

Cast 
Nadia Cassini: Nadia 
Renzo Montagnani: Mr. Grappa 
Irene Papas: La fata 
Yorgo Voyagis: Bel Ami  
Nino Terzo: Lacrima 
Fiorenzo Fiorentini: the priest 
Gigi Ballista: the Bishop

References

External links

1981 films
1980s sex comedy films
Films directed by Nando Cicero
Commedia sexy all'italiana
1980s Italian-language films
1980s Italian films